The 1994 Albion Britons football team was an American football team that represented Albion College as a member of the Michigan Intercollegiate Athletic Association (MIAA) during the 1994 NCAA Division III football season. In their 12th season under head coach Pete Schmidt, the Britons compiled a perfect 13–0 record and won the MIAA championship. It was Albion's sixth consecutive MIAA championship. 

The team was led on offense by tailback Jeff Robinson who gained 1,708 yards during the 1994 season, including 1,273 in the regular season.

The team played its home games at Sprankle-Sprandel Stadium in Albion, Michigan.

Schedule

References

Albion
Albion Britons football seasons
NCAA Division III Football Champions
College football undefeated seasons
Albion Britons football